ONE Television (On Europe Television) was a Swedish television channel which broadcast television shows such as The Bill, Murder Investigation Team and Later with Jools Holland.

The channel closed on 25 February 2007 and was replaced by Kanal 9.

External links 
 Official site 

Defunct television channels in Sweden
Television channels and stations established in 2005
Television channels and stations disestablished in 2007